Odites arenella is a moth in the family Depressariidae. It was described by Henry Legrand in 1966. It is found on Aldabra in the Seychelles.

References

Moths described in 1966
Odites